Tore Sandberg (born 23 April 1944) is a Norwegian journalist, non-fiction writer and private investigator.

He was born in Asker. From 1968 to 1982 he worked as news presenter for the Norwegian Broadcasting Corporation, for Dagsnytt  and Dagsrevyen . He is known for his engagement in cases of miscarriage of justice, including the Liland affair and the Fritz Moen case. His awards include Zola-prisen (2005), Amnestyprisen (2006), Olav Selvaag-prisen, and Rettssikkerhetsprisen (2011).

Selected books
Øksedrapene i Lille Helvete (1992)
Narrespill (2002)
Overgrepet : justismordene på Fritz Moen (2007)

References

1944 births
Living people
People from Asker
Norwegian journalists
NRK people
Norwegian non-fiction writers
Norwegian investigative journalists
Private detectives and investigators